Arphia pseudonietana, known generally as the red-winged grasshopper or red-winged locust, is a species of band-winged grasshopper in the family Acrididae. It is found in Central America and North America.

References

External links

 

Oedipodinae
Articles created by Qbugbot
Insects described in 1870